Taharpur is a village in Shaheed Bhagat Singh Nagar district of Punjab State, India. The village is administrated by Sarpanch an elected representative of the village.

Demography 
As of 2011, Taharpur has a total number of 205 houses and population of 859 of which 446 include are males while 413 are females according to the report published by Census India in 2011. The literacy rate of Taharpur is 76.41% higher than the state average of 75.84%. The population of children under the age of 6 years is 62 which is 7.22% of total population of Taharpur, and child sex ratio is approximately 1067 as compared to Punjab state average of 846.

Most of the people are from Schedule Caste which constitutes 37.49% of total population in Taharpur. The town does not have any Schedule Tribe population so far.

As per the report published by Census India in 2011, 310 people were engaged in work activities out of the total population of Taharpur which includes 271 males and 39 females. According to census survey report 2011, 79.35% workers describe their work as main work and 20.65% workers are involved in Marginal activity providing livelihood for less than 6 months.

Education 
The village has a Punjabi medium, co-ed primary school established in 1966. The school provide mid-day meal per Indian Midday Meal Scheme. As per Right of Children to Free and Compulsory Education Act the school provide free education to children between the ages of 6 and 14.

Amardeep Singh Shergill Memorial college Mukandpur are the nearest colleges.

Transport 

See also 
List of villages in India

References

External links 
 Tourism of Punjab
 Census of Punjab
 Locality Based PINCode

Villages in Shaheed Bhagat Singh Nagar district